Zen 5 is the codename for an upcoming CPU microarchitecture by AMD, shown on their roadmap in May 2022. It is the successor to Zen 4 and is believed to use TSMC's 3nm process. It will power Ryzen 8000 mainstream desktop processors (codenamed "Granite Ridge"), high-end mobile processors (codenamed "Strix Point"), and Epyc 9005 server processors (codenamed "Turin").

Zen 5c 
Zen 5c is a compact variant of the Zen 5 core (mainly) targeted at (hyperscale) cloud customers. It will succeed the Zen 4c core.

References

AMD microarchitectures
AMD x86 microprocessors
X86 microarchitectures